Torcy is a commune in the Pas-de-Calais department of northern France.

Geography
Torcy is located 11 miles (17 km) east of Montreuil on the D130 and in the valley of the river Créquoise. The nearest villages are Sains-lès-Fressin and Créquy.

Population

Places of interest
 The church of St. Eloi, dating from the sixteenth century
 Baladin, a restaurant, bar and guesthouse

See also
Communes of the Pas-de-Calais department

References

Communes of Pas-de-Calais